Ondh Kathe Hella is a 2019 Indian Kannada-language film directed by Girish G and starring Thandav Ram and Somanna. It was released on 8 March 2019.

Cast
Thandav Ram
Somanna
Pratheek
Thara Sadashivaiah
Priyanka Arul Mohan

Production
Made through crowdfunding, Ondh Kathe Hella was a rare anthology film in Kannada cinema.

Reception
The film was released on 8 March 2019. A critic from Times of India wrote "this film tries to mix different styles of thriller tales that have been woven together by one thread. What works for the film is that it stays clear from the gimmicks and tropes used in horror films. At the same time, the scary quotient in the film is relatively less, which can work in both ways". A reviewer from the entertainment portal Filmibeat also gave the film a mixed review.

References

External links

2019 films
2019 drama films
Indian thriller films
2010s Kannada-language films